Ma Sen (馬森, b. 3 October 1932, in Shandong province) is a Taiwanese writer.

Ma Sen is a literary critic, a writer of fiction, and a playwright. He studied film and drama in France starting in 1961, later studying Sociology at the University of British Columbia. He is now a professor at Foguang University in the Graduate Institute of Literary Studies.

See  for Ma Sen's thoughts on the
Chinese literary scene circa 1991.

See  for translations.

References

Taiwanese male novelists
Living people
1932 births
People from Dezhou
University of British Columbia alumni
Chinese male novelists
Taiwanese people from Shandong